Gradina may refer to:

Places
Gradina (a Slavic word for a fortified town) can refer to:

Bosnia and Herzegovina 
 Gradina, Cazin, a village near Cazin
 Gradina, Derventa, a village near Derventa
 Gradina, Fojnica, a village near Fojnica
 Gradina, Gacko, a village near Gacko
 Gradina, Kalinovik, a village near Kalinovik
 , a village near Prijedor
 Gradina, Travnik, a village near Travnik
 Gradina, Velika Kladuša, a village near Velika Kladuša
 , a village near Vlasenica
 Gradina, Zenica, a village near Zenica
 Gornja Gradina, a village near Kozarska Dubica
 Gradina Donja, a village near Kozarska Dubica

Bulgaria 
 Gradina, Pleven Province, a village in Dolni Dabnik Municipality
 Gradina, Plovdiv Province, a village in Parvomay Municipality
 , a village in Loznitsa Municipality

Croatia 
 Gradina, Virovitica-Podravina County, a village and a municipality in eastern Croatia
 Gradina, Šibenik-Knin County, a village near Šibenik, Croatia

Kosovo 
 Gradina (peak), a mountain peak on the Crnoljeva Mountain

Montenegro 
 Gradina, Danilovgrad, an ancient settlement near Danilovgrad
 Gradina,  a village in Žabljak
 Gradina, Pljevlja, a village in Pljevlja
 , a village in Cetinje

Serbia 
Gradina, Postenje, na archaeological site in Serbia, part of UNESCO World Heritage Site Stari Ras in Serbia
Gradina, Jelica, an archaeological site near Čačak
Gradina, Novi Rakovac, an archaeological site on Fruška Gora
Bosut Gradina, a prehistorical archaeological site in Srem
Drežnička Gradina, a mountain in western Serbia

Other uses
 Gradina (tool) is also a toothed chisel used in making sculptures
 Gradina Cismigiu
 Gradina Tower
 Timișoara Zoological Garden
 Kopitareva Gradina

See also
Gradinje (disambiguation)